Epifanio Méndez Fleitas (7 April 1917 – 22 November 1985) was a Paraguayan musician, writer and poet, and twice the president of Central Bank of Paraguay: from 1952 to 1954 and in 1955. He fled Paraguay during the Alfredo Stroessner years and is related to President Fernando Lugo. He died in Buenos Aires.

References 

Presidents of the Central Bank of Paraguay
Paraguayan musicians
20th-century Paraguayan poets
Paraguayan male poets
1917 births
1985 deaths
20th-century male writers